In military radio communications, the AN/PRC-127 (RT-1594) Radio is a handheld transceiver operating in the 136-160 MHz range used by the US Army to aid in provisioning services, and other non-combat uses. It is a software modified version of the civilian LPI series high band Bendix-King radio. The PRC-127 radio was initially manufactured in Lawrence, Kansas, USA from 1989 on by the Bendix-King Corporation, the updated Version PRC-127A from 1996 on by Bendix-King (now a division of Relm Wireless). The final version of this radio is the model AN/PRC-127EFJ, made by E.F. Johnson Technologies, which is a completely different radio.

Technical data:
 Weight: 
 Channels:
 PRC-127: 14 in 1 memory bank
 PRC-127A: 28 in 2 memory banks; one wideband (25 kHz), one narrowband (12.5 kHz)
 Channel spacing: 25 kHz (PRC-127) / 25 kHz + 12.5 kHz (PRC-127A)
 Frequency control: Synthesizer
 Modulation: FM
 HF Output power: 2 Watts (PRC-127) / 3 Watts (PRC-127A) 
 Sensitivity: 0.25 µV
 Power supply: AA cells or NiCad- batteries.
 Specialities: Lid covers keyboard. An extra speaker/mike can be used as well as the VOX/PTT adapter used by special forces units.

References

Military radio systems of the United States
Military electronics of the United States
Mobile telecommunications user equipment